Quesabirria (also called quesotacos or red tacos) ("cheese birria") is a Mexican dish comprising birria-style cooked beef folded into a tortilla with melted cheese and served with a side of broth for dipping. The dish, which has origins in Tijuana, Mexico, gained popularity in the United States through Instagram.

History

Quesabirria was created in Tijuana, Mexico. The dish is inspired by the traditional birria stew of Jalisco. California-based food writer Bill Esparza saw birria being served on tacos at a taco truck called Tacos Aaron in Tijuana around 2009. Other tacos trucks also served it with cheese inside the taco.

Tijuana taqueros brought quesabirria to Los Angeles around 2016. Taqueros and diners began posting about quesabirria on Instagram. Eater credits Instagram with helping quesabirria go "from a handful of vendors serving a regional specialty to a full-fledged phenomenon." Teddy's Red Tacos was one of the most notable food purveyors to  promote quesabirria on Instagram, growing their presence to over 100,000 followers based on the trend. Instagram helped make quesabirria, which is not commonly found at taquerias or Mexican restaurants, a cult food.

In 2019, taqueros in the San Francisco Bay Area took note of the popularity of the dish on social media and began serving it. The first restaurant credited with serving quesabirria in the Bay Area was the food stand Los Originales Tacos de Birria in Antioch, whose owner, Uzziel Rojas, used to eat birria tacos for breakfast as a teenager growing up in Tijuana. Quesabirria purveyors also host pop-ups at bars and breweries. Quesabirria seekers are known for driving long distances and waiting in long lines to acquire the dish.

Today, quesabirria is sold widely across the United States, Mexico and Canada.

Preparation and variations

Quesabirria is "a cross between a taco and a quesadilla."  It comprises a corn tortilla with either mozzarella or Chihuahua cheese melted with stewed meat. The meat is often beef – commonly brisket – in contrast to birria, which is traditionally made with goat. The meat is stewed for up to 10 hours with chilies and spices. The tortilla is folded over on a grill, melting the cheese, meat and tortilla together. Some taqueros serve quesabirria with chopped white onion and cilantro inside the tacos or as a topping. Some taqueros use two tortillas on the grill to prepare their quesabirria, while others, including Los Originales Tacos de Birria, use two tortillas which they fry prior to adding the cheese and meat. 

The dish is served hot with a side of  broth for the diner to dip the taco. The  is the result of hours of stewing the meat used in the tacos. Some diners may sip the  instead of dipping. Quesabirria may also be served with optional salsas and garnishes like pickled habaneros, lime or radish.

Quesabirria Tacos are a delicious and trendy Mexican dish consisting of beef, cheese, and tortillas served with a side of flavorful broth for dipping.

Roster & the Till, in Tampa, Florida, uses lamb neck that is folded into a lamb fat flour tortilla with cheese which is then fried. Charro Vida in Tucson, Arizona offered a jackfruit quesabirria. Some restaurants offer tortas and tostadas made in the style of quesabirria.

Gallery

References

External links

Culture in Tijuana
Beef dishes
Tortilla-based dishes
Food and drink in California
Street food in Mexico
Mexican-American cuisine
Street food in the United States